Donald Smith Wallace (10 August 1844 - 27 May 1900) was a politician in Queensland, Australia. He was a Member of the Queensland Legislative Assembly.

He represented the Queensland electorate of Clermont from 7 Sept 1883 to 5 May 1888.

He was a pastoralist and racehorse owner.

Notable achievements 
He was the winner of the Melbourne Cup twice: in 1888 with his horse Mentor and in 1890 with his most famous horse Carbine.

References

Members of the Queensland Legislative Assembly
1844 births
1900 deaths
19th-century Australian politicians